Burnout is an unincorporated community in Franklin County, Alabama, United States.

Notes

Unincorporated communities in Franklin County, Alabama
Unincorporated communities in Alabama